This is a list of Attorneys and Resident Managers of the Island of Barbuda during the years that Barbuda was under the control of the Codrington family and operated as a slave estate (1738-1834).

References

Attorneys and Resident Managers of Barbuda
People from Barbuda